Carlia S. Westcott was the first woman to receive a license in Marine Engineering in the United States, in December 1921. She was highlighted on the cover of The Woman Engineer after the New York Times covered her. She was from Seattle, Washington.

Sources

Women engineers
Marine engineers

20th-century American women
People from Seattle
Year of birth missing
Year of death missing